David Kiselak (born 2 August 1988) is a Slovenian football defender who plays for NK Dravograd.

External links
 

1988 births
Living people
Sportspeople from Slovenj Gradec
Slovenian footballers
Slovenian expatriate footballers
FK Smederevo players
Serbian SuperLiga players
Association football defenders